Dr Nick Rhodes, Ph.D., is a Reader in Tissue Engineering and Regenerative Medicine at the University of Liverpool, in the U.K. Tissue Engineering can be described as the use of engineering techniques, including engineering materials and processes, in order to grow living tissues. Regenerative Medicine can be described as the treatment of defective tissues using the regenerative capacity of the body's healthy tissues. Combined, Dr Nick Rhodes describes the discipline as "aiming to repair tissue defects by driving regeneration of healthy tissues using engineered materials and processes."

Biography
Dr Nick Rhodes was born in Manchester, UK in 1966 and attended the University of Lancaster where he gained a bachelor's degree in Biochemistry. He gained a Masters in Bioengineering from the University of Strathclyde where he learned the basics of blood compatibility. He trained under Professor David F Williams at the University of Liverpool where he completed his Ph.D. in blood compatibility. He was awarded an Advanced Research Fellowship from the UK Engineering and Physical Sciences Research Council (EPSRC) which allowed him the opportunity to broaden his research into biomaterials for Tissue Engineering .

Dr Rhodes continued his research at the University of Liverpool, being appointed a Lecturer within the faculty of medicine in 1999, followed by Senior Lecturer in 2003, then Reader in 2007. He had a prime role in the funding and design of the UKBioTEC laboratories and co-founded the UK Centre for Tissue Engineering , which exists as a specialised unit within the Division of Clinical Engineering .

Dr Rhodes has served on the editorial board of the International Journal of Adipose Tissue  from 2006–2009 and is currently an Associate Editor of the scientific journal Annals of Biomedical Engineering . He was appointed treasurer and officer of the governing board of the Tissue Engineering & Regenerative Medicine International Society (TERMIS ) in 2005 and has served as on the Medical Engineering EPSRC review panel since 2001. His research centres on soft tissue and cardiovascular tissue engineering and adult stem cells in regenerative medicine and is well known in European Commission funded projects.

He has been featured on the Regenerative Medicine Today newsite, referenced on the BBC News site  and his fellowship work within the EPSRC site

References

External links
Interview
Media article about research
Bio
Lifeboat Foundation Advisory Board

Peer Reviewed Articles
Bryan N, Rhodes NP, Hunt JA (2009). Derivation and performance of an entirely autologous injectable hydrogel delivery system for cell-based therapies. Biomaterials 30:180-8
Stillaert FB, Di Bartolo C, Hunt JA, Rhodes NP, Tognana E, Monstrey S, Blondeel PN (2008). Human clinical experience with adipose precursor cells seeded on hyaluronic acid-based spongy scaffolds. Biomaterials 29:3953-9
Rhodes NP, di Bartolo C, Bellini D, Hunt JA (2008). Induction of adipose tissue regeneration by chemically-modified hyaluronic acid. International Journal of Nano and Biomaterials 1:250-62
Hemmrich K, Van de Sijpe K, Rhodes NP, Hunt JA, di Bartolo C, Pallua N, Blondeel P, von Heimburg D (2008). Autologous in vivo adipose tissue engineering in hyaluronan-based gels – a pilot study. Journal of Surgical Research 144:82-8
Rhodes NP (2007). Inflammatory signals in the development of tissue-engineered soft tissue. Biomaterials 28:5131-6
Rhodes NP, Wilson DJ, Williams RL (2007). The effect of gas plasma modification on platelet and contact phase activation processes. Biomaterials 28:4561-70
Rhodes NP, di Bartolo C, Hunt JA (2007). Analysis of the cellular infiltration of benzyl-esterified hyaluronan sponges implanted in rats. Biomacromolecules 8:2733-8
Tang ZG, Rhodes NP, Hunt JA (2007). Control of the domain microstructures of PLGA and PCL binary systems: Importance of morphology in controlled drug release. Chemical Engineering Research & Design 85:1044-50
Brama M, Rhodes N, Hunt J, Ricci A, Teghil R, Migliaccio S, Della Rocca C, Leccisotti S, Lioi A, Scandurra M, De Maria G, Ferro D, Pu F, Panzini G, Politi L, Scandurra R (2007). Effect of titanium carbide coating on the osseointegration response in vitro and in vivo. Biomaterials 28:595-608
Richardson SM, Walker RV, Parker S, Rhodes NP, Hunt JA, Freemont AJ, Hoyland JA (2006). Intervertebral disc cell-mediated mesenchymal stem cell differentiation. Stem Cells 24:707-16
Rhodes NP, Bellón  JM, Buján MJ, Soldani G, Hunt JA (2005). Inflammatory response to a novel series of siloxane-crosslinked polyurethane elastomers having controlled biodegradation. Journal of Materials Science: Materials in Medicine 16:1207-11
Rhodes NP (2004). Biocompatibiltiy testing of tissue engineered products. Vox Sanguinis 87 Suppl 2:161-3
Tang ZG, Black RA, Curran JM, Hunt JA, Rhodes NP, Williams DF (2004). Surface properties and biocompatibility of solvent-cast poly(ε-caprolactone) films. Biomaterials 25:4741-8
Williams RL, Wilson DJ, Rhodes NP (2004). Stability of plasma-treated silicone rubber and its influence on the interfacial aspects of blood compatibility. Biomaterials 25:4659-73
Rhodes NP, Srivastava JK, Smith RF, Longinotti C (2004). Heterogeneity in proliferative potential of ovine mesenchymal stem cell colonies. Journal of Materials Science: Materials in Medicine 15:397-402
Rhodes NP, Srivastava JK, Smith RF, Longinotti C (2004). Metabolic and histological analysis of mesenchymal stem cells grown in 3-D hyaluronan-based scaffolds. Journal of Materials Science: Materials in Medicine 15:391-95
Smith P, Rhodes NP, Ke Y, Foster CS (2004). Relationship between upregulated oestrogen receptors and expression of growth factors in cultured, human, prostatic stromal cells exposed to estradiol or dihydrotestosterone. Prostate Cancer and Prostatic Diseases 7:57-62
Wilson DJ, Rhodes NP, Williams RL (2003). Surface modification of a segmented polyetherurethane using a low-powered gas plasma and its influence on the activation of the coagulation system. Biomaterials 24:5069-81
Michanetzis GPA, Missirlis YF, Rhodes NP, Williams DF, Eloy R, Lemm W (2002). Influence of test protocol in determining the blood response to model polymers. Journal of Materials Science: Materials in Medicine 13:757-65
Smith P, Rhodes NP, Ke Y, Foster CS (2002). Upregulation of estrogen and androgen receptors modulate expression of FGF-2 and FGF-7 in human, cultured, prostatic stromal cells exposed to high concentrations of estradiol. Prostate Cancer and Prostatic Diseases 5:105-10
<111::AID-PROS3>3.0.CO;2-3 Smith P, Rhodes NP, Ke Y, Foster CS (2000). Modulating effect of estrogen and testosterone on prostatic stromal cell phenotype differentiation induced by noradrenaline and doxazosin. Prostate 44:111-7

Living people
Academics of the University of Liverpool
Alumni of Lancaster University
Alumni of the University of Strathclyde
Scientists from Manchester
English biochemists
1966 births